Pete McGrath (born 6 June 1953) is an Irish Gaelic football manager and former manager of the Down senior football team.

Professional career
McGrath was employed for many years as a physical education teacher at St Colman's College, Newry. He retired from this position in 2006.

Management career
In 1987 McGrath was in charge of the Down team that won the All-Ireland Minor Football Championship.
He managed the Down senior team between 1989 and 2002,
and was at the helm when Down won the Ulster and All Ireland Senior Championships in 1991 and 1994.
He managed the Ireland team in the International Rules Series in 2004 and 2005.

McGrath managed the Down under 21 team to the All Ireland final in 2009, before stepping down in October 2009.

McGrath has had spells in club management with Cooley Kickhams, An Riocht, and Bryansford. He also coached the Gaelic football teams at St Colman's College, guiding them to five Hogan Cup wins between 1975 and 1998 with Ray Morgan.

In October 2010, he returned to county management after being named as the Down minor manager on a three-year term, his second time in charge of the team.

He took manager of the Fermanagh Senior Football team as his second term as manager there after taking the post in 2014. He has taken Fermanagh to the All Ireland Quarter Finals in 2015 and earlier that year gained promotion to Division Two of the Allianz Football League.

He managed the Louth senior football team in 2018 but resigned after ten months into a two-year term following a shock Championship defeat to Leitrim.

He is managed his native club St Bronagh's, Rostrevor for three years having taken over for the 2019 season - the club's centenary year. Now he has taken charge of the club's minor (u17) side for 2022.

Honours
Player
 1 Down Senior Football Championship 1976
 1 All-Ireland Freshers 1973 (c)

Manager
Ireland
 1 Compromise Rules Series 2004
Ulster
 1 Interprovincial 2016
Down
 4 Dr McKenna Cup 1989 1992 1996 1998
 2 All-Ireland Senior Football Championship 1991 1994
 2 Ulster Senior Football Championship 1991 1994
 2 Ulster Under-21 Football Championship 2009 2008
 1 All-Ireland Minor Football Championship 1987
 2 Ulster Minor Football Championship 1986 1987
 1 National Football League Division 3 1997
Club
 1 Down Senior League Football Division 1 2007
 1 Louth League Division 1 2004
 1 Down Under-21 Football Championship 2012
 1 Ulster U21 Championship 2013 (with Bryansford)
School
 4 Hogan Cup 1986, 1988, 1993, 1998 (with Ray Morgan)
 6 McCrory Cup 1978, 1979, 1981,1988 1993 1998 (with Ray Morgan)

References

 

1953 births
Living people
Down inter-county Gaelic footballers
Gaelic football managers
Ireland international rules football team coaches
Irish schoolteachers